Regan Gough (born 6 October 1996) is a New Zealand professional track cyclist and road cyclist who currently rides for UCI ProTeam .

Career
He rode at the 2015 UCI Track Cycling World Championships where he won gold in the team pursuit. He was first on stage two of the 2014 Tour de Vineyards. At the 2014 UCI Juniors Track World Championships he won the madison and points race junior titles. Alongside Pieter Bulling, Aaron Gate, and Dylan Kennett, he came fourth in the men's team pursuit at the 2016 Rio Olympics, being beaten by Denmark to the bronze medal.

In 2022 Gough won the National Time Trial Championships beating fellow teammate Michael Vink by 1 minute 23 seconds.

Major results

Track

2013 
 National Track Championships
1st  Points race
2nd Scratch
2nd Individual pursuit
 UCI Junior Track World Championships
2nd  Madison
2nd  Team pursuit
2014
 UCI Junior Track World Championships
1st  Points race
1st  Madison (with Luke Mudgway)
2nd  Individual pursuit
2nd  Team pursuit
 National Junior Track Championships
1st  Individual pursuit
2nd Madison
2nd Omnium
2nd Scratch
2015
 1st  Team pursuit, UCI Track World Championships
 National Track Championships
1st  Points race
2nd Madison
 Dublin Track Championships
1st Individual pursuit
1st Points race
 UCI World Cup
2nd  Team pursuit, Cambridge
2016
 Oceania Track Championships
2nd  Omnium
3rd  Madison
2017
 2nd  Team pursuit, UCI Track World Championships
 2nd Omnium, National Track Championships
2018
 UCI World Cup
1st  Team pursuit, Cambridge
2019
 UCI World Cup
2nd  Team pursuit, Brisbane
3rd  Team pursuit, Cambridge
 Oceania Track Championships
2nd  Points race
3rd  Omnium
3rd  Madison
2020
 1st  Elimination race, National Track Championships
 2nd  Team pursuit, UCI Track World Championships
2021
 National Track Championships
1st  Omnium
1st  Madison (with Tom Sexton)

Road

2013
 1st Prologue Hawkes Bay 2-day Tour
2014
 Tour of Taranaki
1st Stages 2 & 3
 1st Prologue Hawkes Bay 2-day Tour
 1st Stage 2 Tour de Vineyards
2015
 1st Prologue Tour of Southland
2016
 1st  National Criterium Championships
 1st Prologue Hawkes Bay 2-day Tour
 1st Prologue Tour of Southland
 2nd Lake Taupo Cycle Challenge Men's Classic
2017
 National Under–23 Road Championships
1st  Time trial
1st  Road race
 1st Stage 5 An Post Ras
2018
 1st Overall Hawkes Bay 2-day Tour
1st Stage 2
2019
 1st Gastown Grand Prix
2021
 New Zealand Cycle Classic
1st  Points classification
1st Stages 1 (TTT) & 3
2022
 1st  Time trial, National Road Championships
 1st Stages 1 (TTT) & 5 New Zealand Cycle Classic

References

External links
 
 
 
 
 
 
 

1996 births
Living people
New Zealand male cyclists
Place of birth missing (living people)
Cyclists at the 2016 Summer Olympics
Cyclists at the 2020 Summer Olympics
Olympic cyclists of New Zealand
New Zealand track cyclists
People from Waipukurau
Cyclists at the 2018 Commonwealth Games
Commonwealth Games competitors for New Zealand
Sportspeople from the Hawke's Bay Region
21st-century New Zealand people